Omri Moshe Casspi (born June 22, 1988) is an Israeli former professional basketball player. He mainly played at the small forward position, but could play also at the power forward position.

Casspi was drafted 23rd overall in the 2009 NBA draft by the Sacramento Kings, making him the first Israeli to be selected in the first round of an NBA draft. With his Kings debut in 2009, Casspi became the first Israeli to play in an NBA game. As a rookie, Casspi was chosen to participate in the NBA All-Star Weekend Rookie Challenge. The Cleveland Cavaliers traded for him in June 2011, and he signed with the Houston Rockets in July 2013. In July 2014, Casspi was traded to the New Orleans Pelicans as part of a three-team trade, but was later waived. He then returned to Sacramento prior to the 2014–15 season. In February 2017, he was traded to the Pelicans alongside DeMarcus Cousins, and signed with the Warriors during the offseason. Waived after an April injury, he signed with Memphis in July 2018.

Early life
One of the few Jewish players to reach the NBA after Dolph Schayes, Ernie Grunfeld, Danny Schayes and Jordan Farmar and the first Israeli-born, Omri Casspi was born in Holon, Israel. He was raised in the city of Yavne, Israel. He is the son of Shimon and Ilana, and has an older brother, Eitan, and a younger sister, Aviv. Both of Casspi's parents are Israeli-born and of Moroccan-Jewish descent. As an adult, he added the middle name "Moshe" in memory of his grandfather.

As a child, Casspi played for junior programs at Elitzur Yavne and Maccabi Rishon LeZion. When he was 13, he moved to the Maccabi Tel Aviv youth team, winning the State Youth championship in 2005.

Professional career

Maccabi Tel Aviv (2005–2006) 
Having previously played for Maccabi Tel Aviv youth team, Casspi made his professional debut at age 17 with Maccabi Tel Aviv during the 2005–06 season. In his rookie season as a professional player, he had averages of 4.2 points and 2.1 rebounds in 9.4 minutes per game in the Israeli Premier League.

Hapoel Galil Elyon (2006–2007) 
In 2006, Casspi was loaned to Hapoel Galil Elyon for the 2006–07 season, going on to have a breakthrough season behind him. He averaged 11.1 points and 3.1 rebounds over 28 games. In April 2007, he scored 14 points for the World Select team at the Nike Hoop Summit in Memphis.

Return to Maccabi Tel Aviv (2007–2009) 
Casspi returned to Maccabi for the 2007–08 season. The team reached the EuroLeague Finals in 2008. Casspi received the 2008 Israeli League Sixth Man of the Year award, averaging 10.4 points and 4 rebounds per game. In February 2009, he finished in fourth place in voting for the FIBA Europe Young Men's Player of the Year Award for the 2008–09 season, behind Ricky Rubio, Danilo Gallinari and Kosta Koufos. Maccabi won a state championship in 2009. In the same season, Casspi's role in the team increased in the Israeli League, as well as in the EuroLeague. Over 27 league games, Casspi averaged 12.8 points, 4.8 rebounds and 1.8 assists, all career-highs.

In 2008, Casspi declared himself eligible for the 2008 NBA draft, but he withdrew before the declaration deadline after failing to receive a first-round draft guarantee from any NBA club.

Sacramento Kings (2009–2011)
On June 25, 2009, Casspi was selected with the 23rd overall pick by the Sacramento Kings in the 2009 NBA draft, becoming the first Israeli player selected as a first-round draft pick. Not since Oded Kattash agreed to a contract with the New York Knicks in 1999 had an Israeli player come so close to playing in the NBA. On July 10, 2009, he signed a multi-year deal with the Kings.

On October 28, 2009, Casspi made his NBA debut for the Kings against the Oklahoma City Thunder, scoring 15 points. On December 16, 2009, Casspi made his first NBA start. Scoring 22 points against the Washington Wizards, he tied the most points scored by any Kings player in his first start since the team moved to Sacramento in 1985.

On January 1, 2010, Casspi scored a then career-high 23 points against the Los Angeles Lakers (along with 6 rebounds, 1 steal, and 3 assists) as the Kings lost, 109–108. On January 2, 2010, he grabbed a career-high 11 rebounds against the Dallas Mavericks (along with 22 points, 1 steal, and 4 assists) as the Kings lost, 99–91. On January 5, 2010, Casspi set a new career-high with 24 points against the Phoenix Suns (along with 7 rebounds, 1 assist, no turnovers, and 10–19 from the field) as the Kings lost, 113–109.

In February 2010, Casspi was chosen to participate in the NBA All-Star Weekend Rookie Challenge, as well as the NBA All-Star Weekend H–O–R–S–E Competition against Kevin Durant and Rajon Rondo.

In 2010–11, Casspi played in 71 games for Sacramento (starting 27 of them). He averaged 8.6 points, shot .412 shooting (including .372 from three-point range), and averaged 4.3 rebounds and 1.0 assists in 24.1 minutes per game. In his two seasons for Sacramento, he averaged 9.5 points on .431 shooting, 4.4 rebounds, and 1.1 assists in 24.6 minutes per game.

Cleveland Cavaliers (2011–2013)
On June 30, 2011, Casspi was traded, along with a 2012 first round draft pick, to the Cleveland Cavaliers in exchange for JJ Hickson.

Houston Rockets (2013–2014)

On July 16, 2013, Casspi signed a multi-year deal with the Houston Rockets. On November 1, 2013, for the first time Israelis on opposing NBA teams faced each other, as the Rockets played Gal Mekel and the Dallas Mavericks; the two were teammates on the Israelis Under 16, Under 18, and Under 20 teams, and on the Maccabi Tel Aviv junior team.

On July 15, 2014, Casspi was traded from the Rockets to the New Orleans Pelicans in a three-team trade that also involved the Washington Wizards. On July 23, 2014, he was waived bye the Pelicans.

Return to the Kings (2014–2017)
On September 18, 2014, Casspi signed with the Sacramento Kings, returning for a second stint. On April 7, 2015, he scored a then career-high 31 points on 12-of-20 shooting in a 116-111 win over the Minnesota Timberwolves.

On July 14, 2015, Casspi re-signed with the Kings. On December 28, 2015, he scored a career-high 36 points in a loss to the Golden State Warriors. He also tied Mike Bibby's team record with nine three-pointers.

While shooting 44.8 percent from outside of the arc, he was being mentioned as a candidate for the All-Star Three-Point Contest.

New Orleans Pelicans (2017)
On February 20, 2017, Casspi and teammate DeMarcus Cousins were traded to the New Orleans Pelicans in exchange for Tyreke Evans, Buddy Hield, Langston Galloway, and 2017 first round and second round draft picks. In his only game for the Pelicans three days later, Casspi broke his right thumb after scoring 12 points in the 129–99 loss to the Houston Rockets. He was subsequently waived by the Pelicans on February 25 after being ruled out for four to six weeks.

Minnesota Timberwolves (2017)
On March 20, 2017, Casspi signed with the Minnesota Timberwolves.

Golden State Warriors (2017–2018)
On July 12, 2017, Casspi signed with the Golden State Warriors. On December 14, 2017, he posted his 17th career double-double with 17 points and a season-high 11 rebounds in a 112–97 win over the Dallas Mavericks. On February 12, 2018, Casspi posted a season-high 19 points and 10 rebounds in a 129–83 win over the Phoenix Suns. On April 7, 2018, Casspi, being injured, was waived by the Warriors to make room for Quinn Cook on their playoff roster. Coach Steve Kerr explained that “We love Omri and what he brought to the team...It was difficult to sit with him and tell him we were going to do this." Without Casspi, the Warriors went on to win the NBA championship in 2018. Casspi subsequently received a championship ring from the Warriors for his contribution during the 2017–18 season.

Memphis Grizzlies (2018–2019)
On July 11, 2018, Casspi signed with the Memphis Grizzlies. Entering the 2018–19 season, Casspi had yet to participate in the NBA playoffs, the NBA's longest active tenured player to have never played in a playoff game, ranking him number five overall in league history, he finished the season ranking fourth on that list. On February 1, 2019, Casspi suffered from a meniscus tear in his right knee and surgery would be scheduled accordingly. On February 7, he was waived by the Grizzlies.

Third stint with Maccabi Tel Aviv (2019–2021)
On August 13, 2019, Casspi returned to Maccabi Tel Aviv for a second stint, signing a three-year deal after playing ten seasons in the NBA. On November 1, 2019, Casspi was named Israeli Player of the Month after averaging 11.3 points, 5.5 rebounds, 3.0 assists and 1.8 steals in four games played in October.

On July 18, 2021, Casspi announced his retirement from basketball.

Career statistics

NBA

Regular season

|-
| style="text-align:left;"| 
| style="text-align:left;"| Sacramento
| 77 || 31 || 25.1 || .446 || .369 || .672 || 4.5 || 1.2 || .7 || .2 || 10.3
|-
| style="text-align:left;"| 
| style="text-align:left;"| Sacramento
| 71 || 27 || 24.0 || .412 || .372 || .673 || 4.3 || 1.0 || .8 || .2 || 8.6
|-
| style="text-align:left;"| 
| style="text-align:left;"| Cleveland
| 65 || 35 || 20.6 || .403 || .315 || .685 || 3.5 || 1.0 || .6 || .3 || 7.1
|-
| style="text-align:left;"| 
| style="text-align:left;"| Cleveland
| 43 || 1 || 11.7 || .394 || .329 || .537 || 2.7 || .7 || .6 || .3 || 4.0
|-
| style="text-align:left;"| 
| style="text-align:left;"| Houston
| 71 || 2 || 18.1|| .422 || .347 || .680 || 3.7 || 1.2 || .6 || .2 || 6.9
|-
| style="text-align:left;"| 
| style="text-align:left;"| Sacramento
| 67 || 19 || 21.1 || .489 || .402 || .733 || 3.9 || 1.5 || .5 || .1 || 8.9
|-
| style="text-align:left;"| 
| style="text-align:left;"| Sacramento
| 69 || 21 || 27.2 || .481 || .409 || .648 || 5.9 || 1.4 || .8 || .2 || 11.8
|-
| style="text-align:left;"| 
| style="text-align:left;"| Sacramento
| 22 || 2 || 18.0 || .453 || .379 || .571 || 4.1 || 1.2 || .5 || .0 || 5.9
|-
| style="text-align:left;"| 
| style="text-align:left;"| New Orleans
| 1 || 0 || 24.0 || .556 || .500 || .000 || 2.0 || .0 || .0 || .0 || 12.0
|-
| style="text-align:left;"| 
| style="text-align:left;"| Minnesota
| 13 || 0 || 17.1 || .487 || .200 || .625 || 1.5 || .8 || 1.0 || .2 || 3.5
|-
| style="text-align:left;"| 
| style="text-align:left;"| Golden State
| 53 || 7 || 14.0 || .580 || .455 || .725 || 3.8 || 1.0 || .3 || .4 || 5.7
|-
| style="text-align:left;"| 
| style="text-align:left;"| Memphis
| 36 || 0 || 14.4 || .534 || .349 || .672 || 3.2 || .7 || .6 || .3 || 6.3
|- class="sortbottom"
| style="text-align:center;" colspan="2"| Career
| 588 || 145 || 20.3 || .454 || .368 || .678 || 4.0 || 1.1 || .6 || .2 || 7.9

EuroLeague

|-
| style="text-align:left;"| 2005–06
| style="text-align:left;" rowspan=5| Maccabi Tel Aviv
| 3 || 0 || 2.7 || .000 || .000 || .500 || .0 || .0 || .0 || .0 || .7 || - 1.7
|-
| style="text-align:left;"| 2007–08
| 20 || 7 || 11.3 || .545|| .286 || .600 || 2.1 || .6 || .3 || .3 || 4.5 || 4.7
|-
| style="text-align:left;"| 2008–09
| 16 || 8 || 17.5|| .505 || .450 || .771 || 3.1 || .4 || .8 || .2 || 8.8 || 7.1
|-
| style="text-align:left;"| 2019–20
| 6|| 6 || 21.2 || .636 || .250 || .560 || 5.3 || 3.2 || 1.3 || .2 || 12.0 || 18.3
|-
| style="text-align:left;"| 2020–21
| 16|| 6 || 11.2 || .448 || .333|| .579 || 2.4 || 0.8 || 0.3 || .3 || 4.1 || 4.5

|- class="sortbottom"
| style="text-align:center;" colspan="2"| Career
| 61 || 27 || 13.5 || .516 || .346 || .639 || 2.7 || .8 || .5 || .2 || 6.1 || 6.6

National team career
Casspi plays for the senior Israeli national team in international competition, and he was the team's captain at the 2015 EuroBasket.

Omri Casspi Foundation
Casspi runs the Omri Casspi Foundation, which every year sponsors trips backed by the National Basketball Players Association, for NBA players, WNBA players, and other celebrities, to Israel. The goal of the foundation is reach populations and show to the world what Israel is really like. In 2015, those joining Casspi included DeMarcus Cousins, Caron Butler, Chandler Parsons, Iman Shumpert and Tyreke Evans. The 2016 delegation included Jeremy Piven, Shawn Marion, Amar'e Stoudemire, Beno Udrih, Rudy Gay, Donald Sloan, Chris Copeland, Georges St-Pierre, Alysha Clark, Mistie Bass and Maria Ho.

Honors
On July 6, 2017, Casspi was one of seven athletes to have been honored with participation in the torch lighting ceremony of the 2017 Maccabiah Games.

See also

List of Jewish basketball players

References

External links

Omri Casspi at euroleague.net

1988 births
Living people
Cleveland Cavaliers players
Golden State Warriors players
Hapoel Galil Elyon players
Houston Rockets players
Israeli Basketball Premier League players
Israeli expatriate basketball people in the United States
Israeli men's basketball players
Israeli people of Moroccan-Jewish descent
Israeli Mizrahi Jews
Jewish men's basketball players
Moroccan men's basketball players
Maccabi Tel Aviv B.C. players
Memphis Grizzlies players
Minnesota Timberwolves players
National Basketball Association players from Israel
New Orleans Pelicans players
Sportspeople from Yavne
Sacramento Kings draft picks
Sacramento Kings players
Small forwards